The Hainan Island Ring Expressway, officially the Hainan Region Ring Expressway and designated G98, is a  that encircles the island of Hainan in the People's Republic of China.

History 
In August 2010, the expressway was formed from the amalgamation of parts from four different expressways: 
 Hainan East Line Expressway, traversing the eastern portion of the island. Leftover was a small section north of the Longqiao interchange, which was redesignated S81 and named the Haikou Connecting Line.
 Hainan West Line Expressway, traversing the western portion of the island, along the coast
 Haikou Ring Expressway, which previously served as a bypass of the city center of Haikou. Leftover was a small section east of the Longqiao interchange, connecting the expressway network to Haikou Meilan International Airport, which was not included in the new designation, and was renamed the Meilan Airport Connecting Line and redesignated S82. 
 Sanya Ring Expressway, which previously served as a bypass of the city center of Sanya.
As part of this amalgamation, the kilometre zero marker of the expressway was set at the Longqiao interchange in Haikou's Longhua District, with numbers increasing clockwise along the expressway.

Route 
The Hainan Ring Expressway forms an orbital route that traverses the island of Hainan. The expressway follows much of the coast of the island, except for a section in the east between Haikou and Qionghai, which takes a more inward and direct route. The G9812 Haikou–Qionghai Expressway, which is partially complete, uses the coastal route for this stretch. 

The Hainan Ring Expressway is currently not connected to any other national-level expressways in China. A bridge is currently being planned from Hainan to Mainland China, over the Qiongzhou Strait. This would connect the Hainan Ring Expressway with the G15 Shenyang–Haikou Expressway and G75 Lanzhou–Haikou Expressway concurrently, which would provide a connection to the rest of the expressway system in China.

A section of the expressway between the Longqiao interchange in Haikou and the Bailian interchange in Chengmai County, originally part of the Haikou Ring Expressway, is concurrent with the G9801 Haikou Ring Expressway.

Eastern route
The eastern portion, formerly known as the Hainan East Line Expressway, traverses through the following administrative divisions from north to south:
Haikou
Ding'an County
Qionghai
Wanning
Lingshui Li Autonomous County
Sanya

Western route
The western portion, formerly known as the Hainan West Line Expressway, traverses through the following cities from north to south:
Haikou
Chengmai County
Lingao County
Danzhou
Changjiang Li Autonomous County
Dongfang
Ledong Li Autonomous County
Sanya

References

Expressways in Hainan
Chinese national-level expressways